Khalevan (also Romanized as Khālevān) is a village in Sanjabi Rural District, Kuzaran District, Kermanshah County, Kermanshah Province, Iran. At the 2006 census, its population was 95, in 20 families.

References 

Populated places in Kermanshah County